The wormwood pug (Eupithecia absinthiata) is a moth of the family Geometridae. The species was first described by Carl Alexander Clerck in 1759. It is a common species across the Palearctic region as well as North America.

The wingspan is 21–23 mm and the forewings are warm brown with two black spots along the costa with a black discal spot completing a distinctive triangle. There is a pale narrow line near the fringe with a distinct whitish spot near the tornus, although this is not as prominent as in the rather similar currant pug. The hindwings are greyish brown.ab. obscura Dietze (Kassimov, Central Russia) is much darker, the forewing described as sepia-coloured.  

Adult larvae are smooth and elongated. They adapt to the basic colour of the respective food plant and are accordingly greenish, cream-colored or brownish colored and usually show a reddish-brown diamond-like pattern on the back. Sometimes light green, almost imarked specimens also appear.
The yellow-brown pupa is provided with greenish wing sheaths. At the cremaster there are eight hook bristles, the middle pair of which is strongly formed.
Eupithecia absinthiata requires examination of  a genital preparation for certain identification.

The species flies at night in June and July and is attracted to light.

As the name suggests, the larva feeds on the flowers of mugwort (which is sometimes called "common wormwood"), but it will also feed on the flowers of a range of other plants (see list below). The species overwinters as a pupa.

Larval food plants
Achillea
Aconitum
Artemisia
Aster
Calluna – heather
Cirsium – creeping thistle
Erica
Eupatorium
Pimpinella – burnet-saxifrage
Senecio
Solidago – goldenrod
Tanacetum
Tripleurospermum – Mayweed

Similar species
Eupithecia assimilata.
Eupithecia expallidata

References

Chinery, Michael (1986, reprinted 1991). Collins Guide to the Insects of Britain and Western Europe.
Skinner, Bernard (1984). The Colour Identification Guide to Moths of the British Isles.

External links

Fauna Europaea
Lepiforum e.V.

Eupithecia
Moths described in 1759
Moths of Asia
Moths of Europe
Moths of North America
Taxa named by Carl Alexander Clerck